The British Rail Class 755 is a class of bi-mode multiple unit passenger train built by Stadler Rail for Greater Anglia. Part of the FLIRT modular train family, the trains first entered service on 29 July 2019 and are used on regional and local services throughout East Anglia.

History 

In August 2016, Greater Anglia was awarded the East Anglia franchise with a commitment to replace all of the existing fleet with modern trains. As part of this an order was placed with Stadler Rail for 38 bi-mode multiple units from the FLIRT family. 
The order was financed by rolling stock company (ROSCO) Rock Rail.
These new trains were classified as Class 755. The order was made up of 14 three-car 755/3 sets and 24 four-car 755/4 sets, intended to replace the diesel Class 153, 156 and 170 fleets. Alongside the related electric multiple units of Class 745, the units are maintained at Crown Point TMD.

The plan was for the units to be assigned to Greater Anglia's more local and regional routes throughout Norfolk and Suffolk, which include the Wherry Lines (Norwich to Great Yarmouth and Lowestoft) and the Bittern Line to Sheringham. The units would also be assigned to services on the Breckland Line and on the Ipswich–Ely line, as well as the Felixstowe and Sudbury branch lines. Compared with the diesel multiple units they replace, the 755s have more seats, mains and USB sockets, faster Wi-Fi, air conditioning and improved passenger information systems. Because the trains have power-packs to contain the diesel generators, the floor is lower than usual, providing better accessibility to wheelchair and pushchair users.

Operation 

The first unit was delivered to the UK in November 2018 which gave an initial entry into service date planned for May 2019. By May 2019, the trains had not been authorised to enter service yet and instead were given a service date for the end of June or beginning of July. Following this, the trains were authorised to enter service on 30 May 2019 by the ORR and they finally did so on 29 July 2019.

As more units gradually entered service, Greater Anglia was able to withdraw all its diesel multiple-unit trains in favour of the 755s. All 38 of the units have entered service. The delay in all units entering service was caused by some initial multiple faults ("result of disruption due to a mixture of train faults and a problem with the signalling system on the Norwich-Sheringham line").

Technical details 
Class 755 units have three or four passenger vehicles, along with a separate "Power Pack" vehicle near the centre of the unit that can be fitted with up to four Deutz 16-litre V8 diesel engines and generators. Class 755/4 units have four engines, while 755/3 units have two (mounted diagonally opposite each other). All vehicles are linked by unpowered Jacobs bogies, while the outermost bogie at each end of each unit carries the traction motors. The unusual layout for a British train allows a lower than normal floor level, enabling step-free boarding at standard-height platforms. Pantographs are mounted on the intermediate cars.

Accidents and incidents 
The driver of 755416 initiated an emergency brake application, but the train was unable to stop until it was  beyond the level crossing. A collision was avoided by less than half a second.

The Rail Accident Investigation Branch opened an investigation into the incident. In response, Greater Anglia imposed a temporary  speed restriction over six level crossings on the Bittern Line. The cause of the incident was contamination of the track interfering with detection of the train by track circuits. The equipment had been set to open the crossing 16 seconds after a loss of signal.

As a result of the incident, flange lubricators were removed from the class. The equipment operating the level crossing was reset to open the level crossing 99 seconds after a loss of signal. A computer program on the train was rewritten to remove a 10-second delay in the application of sand in the event of wheelslide. The frequency of Rail Head Treatment Trains over the Bittern Line was increased from weekdays only to daily during leaf-fall season.

On 30 January 2022, unit 755331 became stranded between Reedham and  due to damaged track on the Haddiscoe Cut section of the Wherry Lines. Five passengers aboard the unit at the time were evacuated with no fatalities or major injuries. Following repairs, the line was reopened on 5 February.

Fleet details 

Individual vehicles are numbered as follows, with the last three digits of each vehicle number matching those of the unit to which it belongs:

European Vehicle Numbers for the fleet are devised by prefixing the domestic vehicle number with type code 90, country code 70, and a leading zero; "90700...".

Illustration

See also 

   A similar class of electric multiple units also being built by Stadler Rail for Greater Anglia (not bi-mode).
   A similar class of diesel-electric multiple unit which are being built for Transport for Wales by Swiss rolling stock manufacturer Stadler Rail (not bi-mode).
   A similar class of tri-mode multiple units which will be built for Transport for Wales Rail by Swiss rolling stock manufacturer Stadler Rail.

Notes

References

755
Stadler Rail multiple units
Hybrid multiple units
Train-related introductions in 2019
25 kV AC multiple units